"Million Years Ago" is a song recorded by English singer-songwriter Adele for her third studio album, 25 (2015). The song was written by Adele and Greg Kurstin, with production of the song provided by the latter. Lyrically, the track is about how fame has personally affected her and everyone around her. On Adele at the BBC in 2015, she stated that the song was, "kind of a story about ... I drove past Brockwell Park, which is a park in South London I used to live by. It's where I spent a lot of my youth". Musically, the song is an acoustic tune accompanied only by guitar.

"Million Years Ago" charted in Australia, Belgium, Canada, France, Finland, Germany, Hungary, Ireland, Spain, the United Kingdom and the United States. Adele performed the song during Adele at the BBC, Adele Live in New York City, and on Today.

Composition

"Million Years Ago" is an acoustic tune accompanied only by guitar, finds Adele pining "for the normality of her not-so-distant childhood. Entwined with Middle Eastern twists of background hums that suggest Madonna's 'Frozen'".
The song's lyrics touch upon themes of fame, and how it "frightens", the song's lyrics talk about how fame has personally affected her and everyone around her, singing about how she misses the air, her mother, and her friends, but her "life is flashing by and all I can do is watch and cry." Jon Pareles of The New York Times described the song as a "delicate guitar ballad with a hint of Edith Piaf [that] mourns lost youth". Rolling Stone Brian Hiatt compared the song to "a Nineties Madonna ballad mixed with 'The Girl From Ipanema'".

Plagiarism Accusation
In December 2015, Adele was accused of plagiarizing the melody of "Million Years Ago" from singer Ahmet Kaya's 1985 song "Acilara Tutunmak". 

In September 2021, she was accused by Toninho Geraes of plagiarizing his song, Mulheres, with an expert analysis showing that 88% of the melody is similar. After the lack of responses from Adele's representatives, the song's author said he will take the case to court.

Live performances

She performed the song on Adele at the BBC, which was recorded at The London Studios on 2 November 2015 and broadcast on BBC One on 20 November 2015. She also performed the song on Today on 25 November 2015.
Adele also performed the song on Adele Live in New York City, which was recorded at a one-night-only show at Radio City Music Hall on 17 November 2015 and broadcast on NBC on 14 December 2015.

Adele received a Daytime Emmy Award for Outstanding Musical Performance in a Daytime Program nomination for performing "Million Years Ago" live on Today.

Charts

Certifications

References

2010s ballads
2015 songs
Adele songs
English folk songs
Folk ballads
Song recordings produced by Greg Kurstin
Songs involved in plagiarism controversies
Songs written by Adele
Songs written by Greg Kurstin